Anolis marcanoi, the red-fanned stout anole, is a species of lizard in the family Dactyloidae. The species is found in the Dominican Republic. 

The specific epithet, marcanoi, is in honor of the Dominican botanist, entomologist, herpetologist, speleologist and researcher Eugenio de Jesús Marcano Fondeur.

References

Anoles
Endemic fauna of the Dominican Republic
Reptiles of the Dominican Republic
Reptiles described in 1975
Taxa named by Ernest Edward Williams